Uzi, in Iran, may refer to:
 Uzi, Kaleybar
 Uzi, Varzaqan